Sybra consputa is a species of beetle in the family Cerambycidae. It was described by Pascoe in 1865.

References

consputa
Beetles described in 1865